The Children's Storefront is a 1988 American short documentary film about The Children's Storefront, an independent tuition-free school in Harlem set up in 1966 to help underprivileged children get a better education. Directed by Karen Goodman, it was nominated for an Academy Award for Best Documentary Short.

References

External links

1988 films
1980s short documentary films
American independent films
Films set in Harlem
Documentary films about education in the United States
Documentary films about New York City
Education in Manhattan
American short documentary films
1988 independent films
1980s English-language films
1980s American films